Jerusalem District Police is a regional district command of the Israel Police. It is considered one of the oldest police commands in Israel.

History
Jerusalem's police history goes back to the British Mandate and before that to the administration of Ottoman Syria.

The Jerusalem District's current boundaries include municipal Jerusalem as well as suburbs in Greater Jerusalem including Beit Shemesh, Mevasseret Zion, Abu Gosh, Kiryat Yearim, Givat Ze'ev and other regional councils.

There are 734,000 people within the jurisdiction, approximately 68% of them Jewish, 28% Muslim and 2% Christian.

Jerusalem Police Commander
Yeshurun Sheif (1948–1949)
Levi Abrahami (1949–1958)
Yoav Pelleg (Felic Kamp) (1958–1961)
Shaul Rosolio (1962–1970), commander of the Southern District
David Ofer (1970–1972)
Aharon Shloush (1972–1973)
Haim Tavori (1973–1975)
Arieh Ibtzen (1975–1981)
Joshua Caspi (1981–1984)
Abraham Turjeman (1984–1985)
Rahamim Komfort (1985–1990), Commander of the Southern and Jerusalem District
Haim Ellbalads (January 1991 – 1993)
Rafi Pelled (February–April 1993)
Yehuda Wilk (March 1993–May 1994)
Arieh Amit (1994–1997)
Yair Itzchaky (1997–2000)
Michael (Mickey) Levy (December 2000 – 2003)
Ilan Franco (July 2004–June 2007)
Aharon Franco (June 2007–March 2011)
Nisso Shacham (May 2011 – 2012)
Yossi Parienty (July 2012 – 2014)
Moshe 'Chico' Edri  (2014–2016)
Yoram Ha-Levy (since 2016)

References

External links
 Official Website (In Hebrew)

Israel Police
Jerusalem District
Organizations based in Jerusalem
Government agencies established in 1948